The U.S. state of Arkansas currently has four United States congressional districts.

History
The state has had as many as seven districts; the 5th district existed from 1883 through 1963. The 6th existed from 1893 to 1963. The 7th existed from 1903 to 1953.

Current districts and representatives 

List of members of the United States House delegation from Arkansas, their terms, their district boundaries, and the district political ratings according to the CPVI. The delegation has a total of 4 members, all Republicans.

Historical and present district boundaries
Table of United States congressional district boundary maps in the State of Arkansas, presented chronologically. All redistricting events that took place in Arkansas between 1973 and 2013 are shown.

Obsolete districts
 , obsolete since statehood
  (1836–1885)
 , obsolete since the 1960 census
 , obsolete since the 1960 census
 , obsolete since the 1950 census

See also

List of United States congressional districts

References

 
Congressional districts